Harnackia is a genus of flowering plants in the family Asteraceae. It contains only one species, Harnackia bisecta, which is endemic to Cuba.

References

Tageteae
Monotypic Asteraceae genera
Flora of Cuba